This is a list of former constituencies of the Lok Sabha of India, organised by date of abolition. It does not include constituencies which were merely renamed.

Constituencies abolished in 1956

Bombay (2)
The constituencies came into existence in 1951. With the implementation of States Reorganisation Act, 1956, it ceased to exist when these places of erstwhile Bombay State got merged with Mysore State in 1956.
 Belgaum North constituency replaced by Chikkodi constituency of Karnataka
 Belgaum South constituency replaced by Belgaum constituency of Karnataka.

Hyderabad (2)
The constituencies came into existence in 1951. With the implementation of States Reorganisation Act, 1956, it ceased to exist when these places of erstwhile Hyderabad State got merged with Mysore State in 1956.
 Kushtagi constituency replaced by Koppal constituency of Karnataka
 Yadgir constituency replaced by Raichur constituency of Karnataka

Madras (2)
The constituencies came into existence in 1951. With the implementation of States Reorganisation Act, 1956, it ceased to exist when these places of erstwhile Madras State got merged with Mysore State in 1956.
 South Kanara (North) constituency replaced by Udupi constituency of Karnataka
 South Kanara (South) constituency replaced by Mangalore constituency of Karnataka.

Mysore (1)
 Hassan Chickmagalur constituency

Constituencies abolished in 1966
Some of the Constituencies were abolished before 1967 Lok Sabha Elections. The Lok Sabha constituencies, abolished as a result were as follows:

Maharashtra (1)
 Gondia constituency

Mysore (3)
 Bijapur North constituency replaced by Bijapur constituency of Karnataka
 Bijapur South constituency replaced by Bagalkot constituency of Karnataka
 Tiptur constituency

Constituencies abolished in 1976
The recommendations of the Delimitation Commission constituted in 1973 to redraw the boundaries of the Lok Sabha constituencies and their reservation status were approved in 1976. The Lok Sabha constituencies, abolished as a result were as follows:

Andhra Pradesh (2)
 Gudivada constituency
 Kavali constituency

Assam (1)
 Cachar constituency

Karnataka (2)
 Madhugiri constituency
 Hoskote constituency

Kerala (4)
 Thiruvalla constituency
 Ambalapuzha constituency
 Peermade constituency
 Thalassery constituency
Muvattupuzha constituency

Maharashtra (1)
 Khamgaon constituency

Uttar Pradesh (1)
 Dehradun constituency replaced by Haridwar constituency

Constituencies abolished in 2008
The most recent Delimitation Commission was constituted on July 12, 2002. The recommendations of the commission were approved by the Presidential notification on February 19, 2008. The Lok Sabha constituencies, abolished as a result were as follows:

Andhra Pradesh (7)
 Bhadrachalam constituency
 Bobbili constituency
 Hanamkonda constituency
 Miryalguda constituency
 Parvathipuram constituency
 Siddipet constituency
 Tenali constituency

Bihar (10)
 Bagaha constituency
 Balia constituency
 Barh constituency
 Bettiah constituency
 Bikramganj constituency
 Chapra constituency
 Motihari constituency
 Patna constituency
 Rosera constituency
 Saharsa constituency

Chhattisgarh (1)
 Sarangarh constituency

Delhi (3)
 Delhi Sadar constituency
 Karol Bagh constituency
 Outer Delhi constituency

Gujarat (4)
 Ahmedabad constituency
 Kapadvanj constituency
 Mandvi constituency
 Dhandhuka constituency

Haryana (2)
 Bhiwani constituency 
 Mahendragarh constituency

Karnataka (6)
 Chikmagalur constituency
 Dharwad North constituency replaced by Dharwad constituency
 Dharwad South constituency replaced by Haveri constituency
 Kanakapura constituency replaced by Bangalore Rural constituency
 Mangalore constituency replaced by Dakshina Kannada constituency
 Udupi constituency

Kerala (6)
 Adoor constituency
 Chirayinkil constituency
 Manjeri constituency
 Muvattupuzha constituency
 Mukundapuram constituency
 Ottapalam constituency

Madhya Pradesh (2)
 Seoni constituency
 Shajapur constituency

Maharashtra (15)
 Bhandara constituency
 Chimur constituency
 Dahanu constituency
 Erandol constituency
 Ichalkaranji constituency
 Karad constituency
 Khed constituency
 Kolaba constituency
 Kopargaon constituency
 Malegaon constituency
 Pandharpur constituency
 Rajapur constituency
 Ratnagiri constituency
 Washim constituency
 Yavatmal constituency

Odisha (2)
 Deogarh constituency
 Phulbani constituency

Punjab (3)
 Phillaur constituency
 Ropar constituency
 Tarn Taran constituency

Rajasthan (5)
 Bayana constituency replaced by Karauli–Dholpur constituency
 Jhalawar constituency replaced by Jhalawar–Baran constituency
 Salumber constituency replaced by Rajsamand constituency
 Sawai Madhopur constituency replaced by Tonk–Sawai Madhopur constituency
 Tonk constituency replaced by Jaipur Rural constituency

Tamil Nadu (12)
 Chengalpattu constituency replaced by Kancheepuram constituency
 Gobichettipalayam constituency replaced by Tiruppur constituency
 Nagercoil constituency replaced by Kanyakumari constituency
 Palani constituency split between Dindigul constituency and Karur constituency
 Periyakulam constituency replaced by Theni constituency
 Pudukkottai constituency split between Karur constituency, Ramanathapuram constituency, Sivaganga constituency, Thanjavur constituency and Tiruchirapalli constituency
 Rasipuram constituency replaced by Kallakurichi constituency and Namakkal constituency
 Sivakasi constituency split between Tenkasi constituency, Thoothukudi constituency and Virudhunagar constituency
 Tindivanam constituency replaced by Viluppuram constituency
 Tiruchendur constituency split between Kanyakumari constituency, Tirunelveli constituency and Thoothukudi constituency
 Tiruchengode constituency split between Erode constituency, Namakkal constituency and Salem constituency
 Vandavasi constituency replaced by Arani constituency and Tiruvannamalai constituency

Uttar Pradesh (11)
 Balrampur constituency 
 Bilhaur constituency 
 Chail constituency 
 Ghatampur constituency
 Hapur constituency
 Jalesar constituency 
 Khalilabad constituency 
 Khurja constituency
 Padrauna constituency  
 Saidpur constituency
 Shahabad constituency

Uttarakhand (1)
 Nainital constituency replaced by Nainital–Udhamsingh Nagar constituency

West Bengal (8)
 Burdwan constituency
 Calcutta North West constituency
 Calcutta North East constituency
 Durgapur constituency
 Katwa constituency
 Malda constituency
 Nabadwip constituency
 Panskura constituency

Anglo-Indian reserved seats in the Lok Sabha
Between 1952 and 2020, two seats were reserved in the Lok Sabha, the lower house of the Parliament of India, for members of the Anglo-Indian community. These two members were nominated by the President of India on the advice of the Government of India. In January 2020, the Anglo-Indian reserved seats in the Parliament and State Legislatures of India were abolished.

See also
 List of constituencies of the Lok Sabha

References

 
Lok Sabha